Nobody's Angel is the fifteenth studio album by American country music singer Crystal Gayle. Released in September 1988, the album peaked at #63 on the Billboard Country Albums Chart.

The title track, "Nobody's Angel", peaked at #22 on the Billboard Country Singles chart, and is her last Top 40 hit on that chart to date.

Track listing

Personnel
Crystal Gayle - lead vocals
Billy Joe Walker Jr., Larry Byrom - electric and acoustic guitar
Dann Huff - electric guitar
Paul Worley - acoustic guitar
Steve Gibson - gut-string guitar, dobro
Sonny Garrish - steel guitar
Mark O'Connor - fiddle
Dean Parks - electric and acoustic guitar, electric sitar
Michael Rhodes, Neil Stubenhaus - bass
Edgar Meyer - acoustic bass
John Jarvis - piano, electric piano
Hargus "Pig" Robbins, Dennis Burnside, Gary Prim - piano
Charles Cochran - electric piano
Bob Carpenter - accordion, synthesized marimbas 
Mike Lawler, David Innis - synthesizer
Paul Leim, John Robinson - drums, percussion
Terry McMillan - percussion, congas, harmonica
Charlie McCoy - harmonica
James Lassen - bassoon
Randy Sharp, Mac McAnally, Vince Gill, Gary Pigg, Pam Tillis, Jim Photoglo, The Forester Sisters, Val & Birdie, Donna McElroy, Harry Stinson, Jesse Boyce, Jo Ann Neal, Joy Jackson, Thomas Cain, Wendy Waldman, Dennis Locorriere, Gerald Dixon, Gary Pigg- backing vocals
The Nashville String Machine - strings
Carl Gorodetzky - concertmaster
Bergen White - string arrangements
Technical
Eric Prestidge - engineer
Bob Loftus, Daniel Johnston, Joel Bouchillon, John David Parker, Kurt Storey, Lee Groitzsch - recording
Virginia Team - art direction
Jerry Joyner - design

Chart performance

References

Crystal Gayle albums
1988 albums
Albums produced by Jim Ed Norman
Warner Records albums